Aled Roberts (17 May 1962 – 13 February 2022) was a Welsh Liberal Democrat politician from Rhosllanerchrugog, Wrexham. Roberts was a  Member of the Welsh Assembly (AM) for the North Wales Region from 2011 to 2016. Before his election to the Assembly, he was a Councillor and the leader of Wrexham County Borough Council. He served as the Welsh Language Commissioner from 2019 until his death in 2022.

Early life 
Roberts graduated with a law degree at the University of Aberystwyth in 1983. He later went on to practice as a solicitor. In 1985 he was part of a campaign to protect a local Miners' institute from closure. He later stopped practicing law when he was elected as the leader of Wrexham County Borough Council.

Political career 
Roberts was first elected to Wrexham County Borough Council in 1991 for the Rhos and Ponciau Ward. In 2003–2004 he served as Mayor of Wrexham. The council was under no overall control at the time, and in March 2005 he took over as leader of the council following the resignation of the Labour leader of the council. In the 2011 National Assembly for Wales election, Roberts was elected as an Assembly Member for North Wales. Upon his election to the Welsh Assembly, he resigned as leader of Wrexham Borough Council as he felt he could not devote time to both legislatures and did not contest the council election for his seat in 2012.

Shortly after his election, it was discovered that Roberts was a member of the Valuation Tribunal for Wales, which was a proscribed body which AMs were not allowed to be a member of because of a perceived conflict of interest. As a result, Roberts was disqualified from the Welsh Assembly. Roberts stated that he was following a Welsh language guidance document from the Electoral Commission. This document later emerged to have been incorrect, as while the English regulations had been updated in 2010, the Welsh document still gave information based on 2006 regulations.  In July 2011, Roberts' disqualification was overturned by the Assembly on a 30–20 vote.

Roberts later went on to become the Welsh Liberal Democrats' Education spokesman. For the 2016 National Assembly for Wales election, Roberts announced that he would be standing in the Clwyd South constituency. He came fifth in the Clwyd South constituency election to Welsh Labour's Ken Skates and was not re-elected as the Liberal Democrats lost their North Wales region seat to the UK Independence Party.

In 2019, he was appointed by the Welsh Government as the Welsh Language Commissioner to promote the use of the Welsh language. In 2022, he considered opening an investigation into Monmouthshire County Council for adopting a policy of only printing signs in English, omitting Welsh.

Death 
Roberts died in office on 13 February 2022, at the age of 59. He was married and had two sons.

References

External links
 National Assembly for Wales Member profile
 Official website (non-Assembly)

1962 births
2022 deaths
Place of birth missing
Ombudsmen in Wales
Liberal Democrat members of the Senedd
Wales AMs 2011–2016
Welsh solicitors
People from Rhosllanerchrugog
Alumni of Aberystwyth University
Welsh-speaking politicians
Welsh language